Henri de Grèzes (May 25, 1834 - August 5, 1897) was a French Capuchin priest and religious historian.

Life
He was born in 	Grèzes, Haute-Loire. He joined the Capuchin order in 1853 and was ordained priest in 1857. He died in Lyon.

Works
 Jeanne d'Arc franciscaine (1895)
 Histoire de l'Institut des écoles charitables du Saint-Enfant-Jésus, dit de Saint-Maur, suivie de la vie de la révérende mère de Faudoas, supérieure générale de 1837 à 1877 (1894)
 Vie du R. P. Barré, religieux minime, fondateur de l'Institut des écoles charitables du Saint-Enfant-Jésus, dit de Saint-Maur, origine et progrès de cet institut, 1662-1700 (1892)
 Archives capucines recueillies, coordonnées et annotées par le R. P. Henri de Grèzes (1891)
 
 Saint Vernier (Verny, Werner, Garnier), martyr, patron des vignerons en Auvergne, en Bourgogne et en Franche-Comté, sa vie, son martyre et son culte (1889)
 Vie du bienheureux Félix de Nicosie, de l'ordre des FF. mineurs capucins (1888)
 L'ordre de saint François. - par le R. P. Henri de Grèzes (1885)
 Petit manuel de dévotion au glorieux thaumaturge des Frères Mineurs, saint Antoine de Padoue (1870)
 Le Sacré-Coeur de Jésus, études franciscaines, publiées à l'occasion du deuxième centenaire de la bienheureuse Marguerite-Marie (1870)

Capuchins
1834 births
1897 deaths